Nan Green (19 November 1904 - 6 April 1984), was a British communist who in October 1936 volunteered to join her husband George on the Republican side in the Spanish Civil War. She worked in several hospitals as a medical administrator and collator of statistics during the war and after it continued to support veterans of the International Brigade.

Spanish Civil War 
Born Nancy Farrow in Beeston, Nottingham, Nan married George Green, a musician, on 9 November 1929. She joined the Independent Labour Party (ILP) in 1929 but transferred to the Communist Party of Great Britain (CPGB) before the start of the Spanish Civil War. She was asked to go to Spain, where her husband George was already a volunteer, in October 1936.  Their two children were left in Britain, where their places at Summerhill were paid for by a fellow volunteer. She went to the 'English Hospital' at Huete then was posted to other hospitals at Valdeganga, Uclés, and the 'cave hospital' at Ebro. As an administrator and secretary to Dr Len Crome she did valuable organisational work, notably in medical statistics. Her experiences, including forthright criticism of the conditions and food, and being a blood donor in the early days of transfusion, are described in a memoir published in 2004. Her commitment continued after George's death in September 1938. After the end of the war, she accompanied Spanish Republicans escaping by ship from France to Mexico, and became a leading figure in the National Joint Committee for Spanish Relief and the International Brigade Association. During and after the Second World War she was active in humanitarian and left-wing causes, among them the World Peace Movement. She managed to visit and write about the women's prison in Madrid, and survived to see Franco's death and the end of the dictatorship in Spain.

References 

English anti-fascists
1904 births
1984 deaths